The 2018 Tennessee Titans season was the franchise's 49th season in the National Football League and their 59th overall. It also marked the franchise's 22nd season in the state of Tennessee, their first under head coach Mike Vrabel, and the first with new uniforms and blue helmets, as they have worn white helmets since the club was based in Houston, Texas. This season marked the third of four straight in which the Titans finished 9–7. The Titans failed to qualify for the postseason after losing a Week 17 win-and-in contest against their division rival Indianapolis Colts.

In Vrabel's first year with the team, the Titans went 3-3 against divisional opponents, sweeping the Jacksonville Jaguars for the second straight year. The Titans also beat the New England Patriots for the first time since 2002. Quarterback Marcus Mariota had a difficult season, going 7-6 as a starter, throwing 11 touchdowns to eight interceptions, and missing three games due to injury. Backup quarterback Blaine Gabbert started three games, including the season finale against the Colts in which the Titans were eliminated from the playoffs. One major highlight was the breakout season of running back Derrick Henry, who rushed for 1,059 yards and 12 touchdowns. This would be the first of Henry's three-straight 1,000-yard seasons. In a 30-9 Week 14 Thursday Night win over the Jaguars, Henry would rush for 238 yards (franchise record) and four touchdowns (tied-franchise record) on 17 carries, including an NFL-tying record 99-yard touchdown run.

Coaching changes
In their second full season under head coach Mike Mularkey in 2017, the Titans reached the playoffs for the first time since 2008. The Titans won their first playoff game since 2003 in an 18-point halftime comeback wild card victory over the Kansas City Chiefs, winning 22-21. They were then soundly defeated by the New England Patriots 35-14 in the divisional round. The next day on January 15, 2018, the Titans and Mularkey agreed to part ways, ending his three year tenure as head coach with a record of 20–21. Owner Amy Adams Strunk stated that Mularkey and the front office "saw different paths to achieve greater success," specifically with Mularkey not wanting to change any of his coaching staff. Five days later, the Titans named former Houston Texans defensive coordinator Mike Vrabel as the new head coach. Vrabel became the 19th head coach in franchise history. Two weeks later on January 30, the Titans announce the hiring of new offensive coordinator Matt LaFleur. LaFleur was with the Los Angeles Rams in 2017, and was credited for the development of Jared Goff and a Rams offense that led the league in points on route to an 11-5 record. On the same day, the Titans hired their new defensive coordinator Dean Pees. Pees had retired two weeks earlier with the Baltimore  Ravens, citing his comeback with the Titans due to missing the game. Pees served as the Ravens defensive coordinator since their 2012 Super Bowl run, and his 2017 defense led the league in shutouts and takeaways. The next day, the Titans announced several additions to the coaching staff, including quarterback coach Pat O'Hara, secondary coach Kerry Coombs, outside linebackers coach Shane Bowen, inside linebackers coach Tyrone McKenzie, and wide receivers coach Rob Moore.

Notable acquisitions
On March 15 the Titans signed two notable former New England Patriots players, running back Dion Lewis and cornerback Malcolm Butler. The two reunited with current cornerback Logan Ryan, who also played for the Patriots, in which their last season in New England together was capped off with a Super Bowl comeback win. Lewis was most known for his performance in the 2017 season, and Butler was most know for his game-winning interception in Super Bowl XLIX. The Titans signed their new back-up quarterback on March 26, seven-year veteran Blaine Gabbert, after releasing Matt Cassel earlier in the offseason. On August 4, the Titans signed safety Kenny Vaccaro following Johnathan Cyprien's season-ending ACL tear. On August 28, shortly before their final preseason game, the Titans traded their sixth round pick in the 2019 NFL Draft to the Baltimore Ravens for outside linebacker Kamalei Correa.

Draft

Undrafted free agents

Source:

Staff

Final roster

Team captains
Marcus Mariota (QB) 
Delanie Walker (TE)
Jurrell Casey (DE)
Wesley Woodyard (LB)
Daren Bates (ST)
Source:

Preseason

Regular season

Schedule
On January 11, 2018, the NFL announced that the Titans would play the Los Angeles Chargers in one of three London Games at Wembley Stadium in London, England, with the Chargers serving as the home team. It was the Titans' first appearance in the International Series. The exact date, along with the network and kickoff time, were announced in conjunction with the release of the  regular season schedule.

Note: Intra-division opponents are in bold text.

Game summaries

Week 1: at Miami Dolphins

Due to two weather delays, the game lasted for 7 hours and 10 minutes, the longest game since the AFL–NFL merger in 1970.

Week 2: vs. Houston Texans

Week 3: at Jacksonville Jaguars

Week 4: vs. Philadelphia Eagles

Week 5: at Buffalo Bills

Week 6: vs. Baltimore Ravens

Week 7: at Los Angeles Chargers
NFL London Games

Week 9: at Dallas Cowboys

Week 10: vs. New England Patriots

Week 11: at Indianapolis Colts

Week 12: at Houston Texans

Week 13: vs. New York Jets

Week 14: vs. Jacksonville Jaguars

Week 15: at New York Giants

Week 16: vs. Washington Redskins

The Titans were the only AFC South team to defeat all four of their NFC East opponents in 2018.

Week 17: vs. Indianapolis Colts

Standings

Division

Conference

References

External links
 

Tennessee
Tennessee Titans seasons
Tennessee Titans